The Bzura is a river in central Poland, a tributary of the Vistula river (in Wyszogród), with a length of 173 kilometres and a basin area of 7,764 km2. It was noteworthy during the Second World War as Polish forces made a major stand against the Wehrmacht in an attempt to halt the German advance on Warsaw (Battle of the Bzura).

Towns and townships
Zgierz
Aleksandrów Łódzki
Ozorków
Łęczyca
Łowicz
Sochaczew
Brochów
Wyszogród

Right tributaries
Linda
Moszczenica
Mroga
Struga
Bobrówka
Skierniewka
Rawka
Pisia
Sucha
Utrata
Łasica

Left tributaries
Witonia
Ochnia
Słudwia

See also
 Rivers of Poland
 Battle of the Bzura

References

Rivers of Poland
Rivers of Masovian Voivodeship
Rivers of Łódź Voivodeship